Vihterpalu River is a river in Harju and Lääne County, Estonia. The river is 54.1 km long and basin size is 481.1 km2. It runs into Kurkse Strait.

Trouts and Thymallus thymallus live also in the river.

References

Rivers of Estonia
Harju County
Lääne County